ŽKK Gospić (or Gospić Croatia Osiguranje in sponsorship) is a Croatian women's basketball club from Gospić.

History
Gospić has won eight editions of the Croatian championships since 2000, including four titles in a row from 2009. After playing several editions of the Ronchetti Cup and the Eurocup, it made its debut in the Euroleague in 2010.

Honours

Domestic
National Championships – 8

 Croatian Women's Basketball League:
Winners (8): 2000, 2002, 2004, 2006,  2009, 2010, 2011, 2012
Runners-up (4): 2001, 2007, 2008, 2013

National Cups – 7

Ružica Meglaj-Rimac Cup:
Winners (7): 2003, 2005, 2007, 2009, 2010, 2011, 2012
Runners-up (4): 2000, 2002, 2006, 2008

National Super Cups – 0

Croatian Women's Basketball SuperCup:
Runners-up (1): 2007

International
International titles – 3

 Women's Adriatic League:
Winners (2): 2004, 2010
Runners-up (3): 2005, 2008, 2011
 Vojko Herksel Cup
Winners (1): 2008
Runners-up (4): 2006, 2007, 2009, 2010

Notable former players

References

External links
 ŽKK Gospić at eurobasket.com
 ŽKK Gospić at fibaeurope.com

Women's basketball teams in Croatia
EuroLeague Women clubs
Basketball teams established in 1983
Women's basketball teams in Yugoslavia
ZKK